SS John L. McCarley was a Liberty ship built in the United States during World War II. She was named after John L. McCarley.

Construction
John L. McCarley was laid down on 10 January 1945, under a Maritime Commission (MARCOM) contract, MC hull 2342, by J.A. Jones Construction, Panama City, Florida; sponsored by Mrs. Estell Twing, the wife of W.B. Twing, general delivery, she was launched on 14 February 1945.

History
She was allocated to Alcoa Steamship Co., Inc., on 27 February 1945. After a number of contracts, on 19 August 1949, she was laid up in the National Defense Reserve Fleet, Mobile, Alabama. She was sold for scrapping, 1 May 1972, to Pinto Island Metals Co., for $36,850. She was withdrawn from the fleet, 13 July 1972.

References

Bibliography

 
 
 
 

 

Liberty ships
Ships built in Panama City, Florida
1945 ships
Mobile Reserve Fleet